Umuarama is a municipality in the state of Paraná in Brazil. Its population was 112,500 inhabitants in 2020.
Umuarama is one of the most important cities in Paraná, one of the three states of southern Brazil. The city elevation is 430 m (1,300 feet) above sea level and the rainfall is about 1600mm/year (63 inches/yr). Umuarama is known as "The Capital of Friendship".

History

The municipality was founded in 1955, and colonized by Companhia Melhoramentos Norte do Paraná, a company that settled an important number of cities in Northern Paraná.

Tourism
There are a lot of places to visit in Umuarama, the most important are:
 Expo Umuarama
 Aratimbó Lake
 Uirapuru Park
 Park of Xetas (also known as Indian's Park)
 Streetmarkets
 The replica of Eiffel Tower at the Estância Paris 
 Tucuruvi Lake

Umuarama is served by Orlando de Carvalho Airport.

Numbers
 618 Industries
 20 Bank agencies
 7 Hospitals
 4 Universities (State University of Maringá, Unipar, FGU and Alfa)
 58 Graduation Courses
 10 Radio Stations
 50,569 Vehicles (1.97 inhabitants per vehicle)
 100,000 Trees

Climate
Umuarama experiences a tropical climate where the mean temperature in any given month remains above .

Notable people
Jéssica Andrade (born 1991), mixed martial artist
Raissa Santana (born 1995), Miss Brasil 2016

References